STARAN in the information technology industry might be the first commercially available computer designed around an associative memory. The STARAN computer was designed and built by Goodyear Aerospace Corporation. It is a content-addressable parallel processor (CAPP), a type of parallel processor which uses content-addressable memory. The STARAN machines became available in 1972.

Goodyear Aerospace later developed the MPP based on similar principles but with a larger and wider processor array.

See also 
Index of computing articles
Outline of computers
Outline of computing

References 
 
 
 

Goodyear Tire and Rubber Company
One-of-a-kind computers